The Fairies of Liaozhai is a Chinese television series adapted from Pu Songling's collection of supernatural stories titled Strange Stories from a Chinese Studio. The series is produced by Chinese Entertainment Shanghai and stars Nicky Wu, Fann Wong, Qu Ying, Daniel Chan, Lin Chia-yu, Pan Yueming, Sun Li and Cecilia Liu. Shooting began in December 2006 and wrapped up in March 2007. The 40-episode series is divided into four parts — Liancheng, Xia Nü, Huanniang, and Xin Shisiniang.

Cast

Liancheng
Nicky Wu as Qiao Sheng
Fann Wong as Liancheng
Qu Ying as Binniang
Ho Kwai-lam as Prefect Shi

Xia Nü
Daniel Chan as Gu Xiangru
Lin Chia-yu as Xu Mu'e
Sun Xing as Prefect Lin
Cao Xiwen as Lin Yuefu
Song Yang as Fang Wukui

Huanniang
Pan Yueming as Wen Ruchun
Leslie Sun as Zhao Huanniang
Liu Xiaoxi as Lianggong
Andrew Lin as Young Master Qian
Cui Peng as Qiaolangjun

Xin Shisiniang
Cecilia Liu as Xin Shisiniang
TAE as Feng Sheng
Li Qian as Lu'er
Han Xiao as Hu Mei

References

External links

2007 Chinese television series debuts
Serial drama television series
Television shows based on Strange Stories from a Chinese Studio
Television series by Tangren Media
Television series set in Imperial China
Horror fiction television series
Mandarin-language television shows
Chinese television shows